A. K. Antony ministry (27 April 1977 – 27 October 1978) led by Congress Leader A K Antony had eighteen ministers. When this ministry took the oath, A. K. Antony was the youngest Chief Minister of Kerala at age 36.

Ministers

See also 
 Chief Ministers of Kerala
 Kerala Ministers

Antony 01
Indian National Congress state ministries
Indian National Congress of Kerala
1977 establishments in Kerala
1978 disestablishments in India
Cabinets established in 1977
Cabinets disestablished in 1978